Platyclarias machadoi is the only species in the genus Platyclarias of catfishes (order Siluriformes) of the family Clariidae. It originates from the upper Cuango River in Angola. It reaches up to 20.1 centimetres (7.9 in) TL. P. machadoi is easily identified among the clariids due to its extremely flattened head relative to other clariids.

References

Clariidae
Endemic fauna of Angola
Freshwater fish of Angola
Taxa named by Max Poll
Fish described in 1977